This article lists political parties in Rwanda.
Rwanda is a one-party-dominant state with the Rwandan Patriotic Front in power. Opposition parties are allowed, but are widely considered to have no real chance of gaining power.

Active parties

Parties represented in the Chamber of Deputies

Parties without representation in the Chamber of Deputies
Rwandan Socialist Party

Former parties 
National Republican Movement for Democracy and Development
Coalition for the Defence of the Republic
Rwandese National Union

Illegal parties 
Rwandese Protocol to Return the Kingdom (led by Eugene Nkubito)
Coalition of Democratic Forces (led by John Kanyamanza)
Party for Democratic Renewal (led by former president Pasteur Bizimungu)
Democratic Forces for the Liberation of Rwanda
Republican Democratic Movement
Rwanda National Congress (led by Faustin Kayumba Nyamwasa)
Movement for Democratic Change in Rwanda

See also
 Politics of Rwanda
 List of political parties by country

References 

Rwanda
 
Political parties
Political parties
Rwanda